Barron Kilner (11 October 1852 – 28 December 1922) was an English rugby union footballer who played in the 1880s, and rugby union administrator of the 1890s. He played at representative level for England, and Yorkshire, and at club level for Wakefield Trinity (were a rugby union club at the time, so no Heritage № is allocated), as a forward, e.g. front row, lock, or back row. Prior to 27 August 1895, Wakefield Trinity was a rugby union club. Barron Kilner was also Mayor of Wakefield in 1899.

Background
Barron Kilner was born in Thornhill Lees, West Riding of Yorkshire, and he died aged 70 in Wakefield, West Riding of Yorkshire.

Playing career

International honours
Barron Kilner won a cap for England while at Wakefield Trinity in the 1879–80 Home Nations rugby union match against Ireland.

County honours
Kilner represented Yorkshire while at Wakefield Trinity.

"The Rugby Match"
Kilner can be seen in the crowd of William Barnes Wollen's painting "The Rugby Match", which features Yorkshire's 11-3 victory over Lancashire during the 1893/94 season and is now held at the Rugby Football Union headquarters at Twickenham Stadium. Alf Barraclough is shown being tackled, and passing the ball to Jack Toothill, with Tommy Dobson on the outside. Kilner is the first person in the crowd to the right of Dobson's head.

References

External links
Biography of Arthur Budd with an 1890–91 RFU Committee photograph including Barron Kilner

1852 births
1922 deaths
England international rugby union players
English rugby union players
People from Thornhill, West Yorkshire
Rugby union forwards
Rugby union officials
Rugby union players from Dewsbury
Wakefield Trinity players
Yorkshire County RFU players